Kadıköy is a district in Istanbul, Turkey.

Kadıköy (literally "judge's village") may also refer to other places and things in Turkey:

Places
 Kadıköy, Aydın, a village in Aydın district of Aydın Province
 Kadıköy, Balya, a village
 Kadıköy, Baskil
 Kadıköy, Bigadiç, a village
 Kadıköy, Buldan
 Kadıköy, Çay, a village in Çay district of Afyonkarahisar Province
 Kadıköy, Çerkeş
 Kadıköy, Keşan
 Kadıköy, Mut,  a village in Mut district of Mersin Province
 Kadıköy, Nallıhan, a village in Nallıhan district of Ankara Province
 Kadıköy, Orhaneli
 Kadıköy, Refahiye
 Kadıköy, Taşköprü, a village
 Kadıköy, Ulus, a village in Ulus district of Bartın Province
 Kadıköy, Yalova, a town in Yalova Province
 Kadıköy, Yüreğir, a village in Yüreğir district of Adana Province

Other uses
 Kadıköy (Istanbul Metro), a railway station on the M4 line
 Kadıköy Anadolu Lisesi, a high school in Kadıköy district of Istanbul
 Kadıköy Dam, a dam in Edirne Province
 Kadıköy Haldun Taner Stage, a theatre venue located in Kadıköy district of Istanbul
 Kadıköy İnciburnu Feneri, a lighthouse off Kadıköy, Istanbul
 Kadıköy Rugby, a Turkish rugby team

See also
 Kadikoi, a village on the Crimean peninsula, Ukraine